Chal Bagh (also Romanized as Chāl Bāgh; also known as Chālbāgh) is a village in Poshteh-ye Zilayi Rural District, Sarfaryab District, Charam County, Kohgiluyeh and Boyer-Ahmad Province, Iran. At the 2006 census, its population was 160, in 33 families.

References 

Populated places in Charam County